Zhao Cui (died 622 BCE), posthumously known as Zhao Chengzi (Chengzi of Zhao), courtesy name Ziyu (子餘), was a Chinese monarch. He was a dafu of Duke Wen of the Jin state during the Spring and Autumn period. He was the clan leader of Zhao between 636 and 622 BCE.

When Chong'er, later known as Duke Wen of Jin was in exile due to the Li Ji unrest, Zhao Cui had always followed Chong'er. In the state of Qin, they received the assistance of Duke Mu of Qin.  

After Duke Wen's death, he served Duke Xiang of Jin and participated in the battle of Pengya. Jin army defeated Qin army in this battle.

Family 
Cui's brother was Zhao Su who served Duke Xian of Jin.
Zhao Cui married the daughter of Duke Wen of Jin. Before the marriage with the Duke's daughter, Cui had married Shu Kui of Qianggaoru (a branch of the Red Di). He had four sons and named them Zhao Dun (son of Shu Kui), Zhao Tong, Zhao Kuo and Zhao Yingqi respectively. Zhao Dun succeeded Zhao Cui as the head of Zhao.

References 

622 BC deaths
7th-century BC Chinese people
Jin (Chinese state)
Monarchs of Zhao (state)
Zhou dynasty nobility
Zhao (state)